Prospect is an unincorporated community in French Lick Township, Orange County, in the U.S. state of Indiana.

History
The community's original name was New Prospect. New Prospect was laid out in 1836.

A post office was established under the name New Prospect in 1851, but was soon discontinued, in 1853.

Geography

References

Unincorporated communities in Orange County, Indiana
Unincorporated communities in Indiana